Papa John Joseph (27 November 1877 – 22 January 1965) was an early New Orleans jazz string bass player.

Joseph was born in St. James Parish, Louisiana, and moved to New Orleans by 1906.

Early in his career he played with Buddy Bolden. He later played in the Claiborne Williams band and the Original Tuxedo Orchestra.

For years in midlife he worked professionally as a barber, playing music occasionally on the side. He returned to music full-time in his later years. He was a regular at Preservation Hall until he famously dropped dead there after finishing a rousing version of "When the Saints Go Marching In".

References
 New Orleans Jazz: A Family Album by Al Rose and Edmond Souchon
   Allaboutjazz.com

Jazz musicians from New Orleans
1877 births
1965 deaths
American jazz double-bassists
Male double-bassists
American male jazz musicians